Sir Edward Henry Fraser  (15 February 1851 – 10 November 1921) was an English solicitor who was Mayor of Nottingham on four occasions.

He was born in Nottingham and privately educated. He became a solicitor by profession, was appointed the first Secretary of the Nottingham Incorporated Law Society and in 1892 elected its President.

In 1876, he was elected a town councillor for Nottingham, served as Sheriff of Nottingham for 1884–85, was made an Alderman in 1889 and elected Mayor of Nottingham for three successive years in 1896–1899. He was chosen a fourth time in 1910 and knighted in 1908. In 1898 he was also conferred with a D.C.L by the Archbishop of Canterbury. He was an unsuccessful candidate in the Parliamentary election of 1900.

He acted as Chairman of the Corporation Finances Committee, was Chairman of the Derwent Water Board and a Governor of Nottingham University College. He was also a Director of various commercial companies, including the Great Central Railway and the Nottingham Permanent Benefit Building Society. As Clerk to the Governors he was also responsible for the finances of Nottingham High School.

He was granted the Freedom of the City of Nottingham and his portrait hangs in the Guildhall.

In 1877, he married Jane Keightley, daughter of Charles Keightley. They had one son and three daughters. He died at Wellington House, Nottingham.

References

 
 

1851 births
1921 deaths
Knights Bachelor
Nottingham City Councillors
Sheriffs of Nottingham
Mayors of Nottingham
Liberal Party (UK) councillors
Liberal Party (UK) parliamentary candidates